Fumin Road Subdistrict is a subdistrict situated in the southwest of Hedong District, Tianjin. it shares border with Zhongshanmen and Erhaoqiao Subdistricts to the northeast, Wanxin Subdistrict to the southeast, Chentangzhuang and Guajiasi Subdistricts to the southwest, and Dazhigu Subdistrict to the northwest. According to the 2020 Chinese Census, the subdistrict had a population of 45,419.

The subdistrict was named after Fumin Road that runs through it.

History

Administrative divisions 
In 2021, Fumin Road Subdistrict oversaw 11 communities. They are listed as follows:

References 

Township-level divisions of Tianjin
Hedong District, Tianjin